The 2015–16 Rhode Island Rams basketball team represented the University of Rhode Island during the 2015–16 NCAA Division I men's basketball season. The Rams, led by fourth year head coach Dan Hurley, played their home games at the Ryan Center and were members of the Atlantic 10 Conference. They finished the season 17–15, 9–9 in A-10 play to finish in seventh place. They lost in the second round of the A-10 tournament to Massachusetts.

Previous season
The Rams finished the 2014–15 season 23–10, 13–5 in A-10 play to finish in a tie for second place. They advanced to the semifinals of the A-10 tournament where they lost to Dayton. They were invited to the National Invitation Tournament where they defeated Iona in the first round before losing in the second round to Stanford.

Departures

Incoming Transfers

Incoming recruits

Roster

Schedule

|-
!colspan=9 style="background:#75B2DD; color:#002b7f;"| Non-conference regular season

|-
!colspan=9 style="background:#75B2DD; color:#002b7f;"| Atlantic 10 regular season

|-
!colspan=9 style="background:#75B2DD; color:#002b7f;"| Atlantic 10 tournament

See also
 2015–16 Rhode Island Rams women's basketball team

References

Rhode Island Rams men's basketball seasons
Rhode Island